The first Russia-Africa Summit was held on 23–24 October 2019 in Sochi, Russia, co-hosted by Russian President Vladimir Putin and Egyptian President Abdel Fattah el-Sisi. 43 heads of state or government were in attendance. Putin emphasized "state sovereignty" and Russian willingness to offer aid or trade deals "without political or other conditions", said that "an array of Western countries are resorting to pressure, intimidation and blackmail of sovereign African governments," against which Russia was well suited to help African states push back.

Attendees

Hosts 
 Vladimir Putin, President of Russia
 Abdel Fattah el-Sisi, President of Egypt

Other attendees 
 Alpha Conde, President of Guinea
 Filipe Nyusi, President of Mozambique
 Muhammadu Buhari, President of Nigeria
 Cyril Ramaphosa, President of South Africa
 Peter Mutharika, President of Malawi
 Ibrahim Boubacar Keita, President of Mali
 Teodoro Obiang Nguema Mbasogo, President of Equatorial Guinea
 Roch Marc Christian Kaboré, President of Burkina Faso
 Yoweri Museveni, President of Uganda
 Paul Kagame, President of Rwanda
 Nana Addo Dankwa Akufo-Addo, President of Ghana
 Julius Maada Bio, President of Sierra Leone
 Emmerson Mnangagwa, President of Zimbabwe
 Andry Rajoelina, President of Madagascar
 Adama Barrow, President of The Gambia
 Mohamed Ould Ghazouani, President of Mauritania
 Mohamed Abdulahi Farmaajo, President of Somalia
 Idriss Déby, President of Chad
 Abdul Fattah al-Burhan, President of the Sovereignty Council of Sudan
 Abdelkader Bensaleh, Acting President of Algeria
 Denis Sassou Nguesso, President of the Republic of Congo
 Hage Geingob, President of Namibia
 Fayez al-Sarraj, Chairman of the Presidential Council of Libya
 Ismail Omar Guelleh, President of Djibouti
 João Lourenço, President of Angola
 Faustin-Archange Touadéra, President of the Central African Republic
 Felix Tshisekedi, President of the Democratic Republic of the Congo
 Faure Gnassingbe, President of Togo
 Uhuru Kenyatta, President of Kenya
 Patrice Talon, President of Benin
 Danny Faure, President of Seychelles
 Azali Assoumani, President of Comoros
 Mswati III, King of Eswatini
 Jewel Howard Taylor, Vice President of Liberia
 Abiy Ahmed, Prime Minister of Ethiopia
 Julien Nkoghe Bekale, Prime Minister of Gabon
 Kassim Majaliwa, Prime Minister of Tanzania
 Osman Saleh, Minister of Foreign Affairs of Eritrea
 Salva Kiir Mayardit, President South Sudan

References

External sources
The Russia-Africa Summit and Economic Forum

October 2019 events in Russia
21st century in Sochi
Diplomatic conferences in Russia
Africa–Russia relations
Events in Sochi